Spillage of classified information is a contamination of lower level systems with material of a higher classification.

The formal definition by the US Government is found in as: "Security incident that results in the transfer of classified or CUI information onto an information system not accredited (i.e., authorized) for the appropriate security level."

References

Classified information